Apamea bernardino is a moth of the family Noctuidae. It is known only from the San Bernardino Mountains of California, where it lives in coniferous forests above 2000 meters in elevation. It was first described in 2000 from a specimen collected at Barton Flats.

The moth has a rusty brown head and thorax and a buff abdomen with brown and pink-tinged tufts. The wingspan is 39 to 42 millimeters.

References

Apamea (moth)
Endemic fauna of California
Moths of North America
Moths described in 2000
Fauna without expected TNC conservation status